Slovak National Uprising Square (SNP square) is a square in central Bratislava, Slovakia. 

In the 20th century, it served as the focal point for national demonstrations for independence and sovereignty.

Public transport 
 Trams:

Gallery 

Squares in Bratislava
Velvet Revolution